Miss International 1960, the 1st Miss International pageant, was held on August 12, 1960 at the Long Beach Municipal Auditorium in Long Beach, California, United States. 52 contestants competed for the title. Stella Márquez of Colombia was crowned as the first Miss International.

Background
Miss International was created due to internal conflicts with the Miss Universe pageant.

Results

Placements

Special Awards

Preliminary Competition Winners

Contestants

  - Slavica Lazaric
  - Joan Stanbury
  - Elizabeth Hodacs
  - Caroline Lecerf
  - Edmy Arana Ayala
  - Elizabeth Voon (from North Borneo)
  - Magda Renate Pfrimer
  - Julia Ann Adamson
  - Margaret Powell
  - Yvonne Eileen Gunawardene
  - Janet Lin Chin-Yi
  - Stella Márquez
  - Sonja Menzel
  - Magdalena Dávila Varela
  - Joyce Kay
  - Marketta Nieminen
  - Yvette Suzanne Degrémont
  - Kiki Kotsaridou
  - Katinka Bleeker
  - Lena Woo
  - Sigridur Geirsdóttir †
  - Iona Pinto †
  - Wiana Sulastini
  - Lili Dajani
  - Maria Grazia Jacomelli
  - Michiko Takagi
  - Gulnar Tucktuck
  - Kim Chung-ja
  - Juliana Reptsik
  - Liliane Mueller
  - Zanariak Zena Ahmad 
  - Raymonde Valle
  - Lise Hammer
  - Gretel Hedger Carvallo
  - Irma Vargas Fuller
  - Edita Resurreccion Vital
  - Marzena Malinowska
  - Maria Josabete Silva Santos
  - Carmen Sara Latimer
  - Christl D’Cruz
  - Nona Sherriff
  - Patricia Apoliona (from Honolulu)
  - Elena Herrera Dávila-Núñez
  - Gunilla Elm
  - Mylene Delapraz
  - Teura Marguerite Teuira
  - Habiba Ben Abdallah
  - Guler Kivrak
  - Beatriz Liñares
  - Charlene Lundberg
  - Gladys Ascanio
  – Helga Kirsch

Did not compete
  - Gordean Leilehua Lee (withdrew)
  - Tania Velic

Notes

References

External links
Pageantopolis - Miss International 1960

1960
1960 beauty pageants
Beauty pageants in the United States
1960 in California
20th century in Los Angeles County, California